More Than Ever is the second Japan-only compilation album by the a cappella group Rockapella. It contains recording from the US albums Don't Tell Me You Do and 2 with a new photo session of the group.

Track listing

Personnel
Scott Leonard – high tenor
Kevin Wright – tenor
Elliott Kerman – baritone
Barry Carl – bass
Jeff Thacher – vocal percussion

Rockapella albums
2002 compilation albums